Zvonko Ivezić (17 February 1949 – 4 September 2016) was a Yugoslav and Serbian footballer who played as a forward.

Club career
Born in Vajska, Ivezić joined Vojvodina in 1965, before making his Yugoslav First League debut in the 1967–68 season. He amassed a total of 220 appearances and scored 60 goals for the club in the top flight. In 1976, Ivezić moved abroad to France and joined Sochaux, spending six seasons with the club. He also spent one year with Racing Paris, before retiring in 1983.

International career
At international level, Ivezić was capped four times for Yugoslavia between 1975 and 1976, scoring two goals.

Managerial career
In 2002, Ivezić was manager of Vrbas. He also served as manager of Rudar Ugljevik in 2004.

References

External links
 
 
 

Association football forwards
Expatriate football managers in Bosnia and Herzegovina
Expatriate footballers in France
FC Sochaux-Montbéliard players
FK Vojvodina players
FK Vrbas managers
Ligue 1 players
Ligue 2 players
Serbia and Montenegro football managers
Serbia and Montenegro expatriate sportspeople in Bosnia and Herzegovina
Serbian football managers
Serbian footballers
Yugoslav expatriate footballers
Yugoslav expatriates in France
Yugoslav First League players
Yugoslav footballers
Yugoslavia international footballers
1949 births
2016 deaths